Adolfo Fatecha (born 24 November 1972) is a Paraguayan former professional footballer who played as a midfielder for clubs in Paraguay, Uruguay, Argentina, Chile, China and Indonesia.

Clubs
 Olimpia 1992–1996
 Shanghai Shenhua 1997
 Olimpia 1998–1999
 Deportes Puerto Montt 2000
 Deportes Temuco 2000
 Racing Club de Montevideo 2001
 3 de Febrero 2002
 General Caballero 2003–2004
 Guaraní Antonio Franco 2004
 General Caballero 2005
 Persija Jakarta 2005
 PSS Sleman 2006
 Rubio Ñú 2007
 Sportivo Trinidense 2008–2009

Honours
Olimpia
 Paraguayan Primera División: 1993, 1995, 1998, 1999

References
 

1972 births
Living people
Paraguayan footballers
Association football midfielders
Club Olimpia footballers
Club Rubio Ñu footballers
Club Atlético 3 de Febrero players
Sportivo Trinidense footballers
General Caballero Sport Club footballers
Shanghai Shenhua F.C. players
Puerto Montt footballers
Deportes Temuco footballers
Racing Club de Montevideo players
Chilean Primera División players
Primera B de Chile players
Paraguayan expatriate footballers
Paraguayan expatriate sportspeople in Chile
Expatriate footballers in Chile
Paraguayan expatriate sportspeople in China
Expatriate footballers in China
Paraguayan expatriate sportspeople in Uruguay
Expatriate footballers in Uruguay
Paraguayan expatriate sportspeople in Argentina
Expatriate footballers in Argentina
Paraguayan expatriate sportspeople in Indonesia
Expatriate footballers in Indonesia